Johann Oskar Hermann Freese was a,Pomeranian artist. He emphasized animals and hunting scenes.

Personal life 
He was born in Pomerania in 1813. He was expected by his father to be a farmer, in spite of his early inclination to art. At age 34 he devoted himself to painting. He visited the studio of Wilhelm Brücke, then that of Carl Steffeck in Berlin.

Art 
In 1857 his first work, Stags Fighting, appeared. His subjects were principally hunting, which he loved passionately. Among his works are Deer Fleeing, Stags attacked by Wolves and a Boar Hunt, all in the Berlin National Gallery.

Death 
He died at Hessenfelde, near Fürstenwald, in 1871, of brain fever, which he contracted while trying to cross a river.

See also
 List of German painters

References

External links

1813 births
1864 deaths
19th-century German painters
19th-century German male artists
German male painters
German hunters
People from Pomerania